Mister Philippines may refer to:

 Mister World Philippines, a male pageant that selects Philippines' representative to Mister World, Mister Supranational, Mister Eco International, and Mister Multinational
 Misters of Filipinas, a male pageant that selects Philippines' representative to Mister International, Man of the Year, Man of the World, Mister Ocean, and Mister Universe Tourism